Philip McGough (born 1950) is a British actor from Penygraig, Wales, with many appearances on UK television and a former member of the Royal Shakespeare Company.

Personal life
In an interview with The Mirror in 2001, McGough revealed he had trained as a monk between the ages of 14 to 26. After leaving the order, he worked as a teacher before embarking on a Hippy Trip that failed and led him into acting.

McGough is married and has three children.

Career
McGough made his first big break on TV in Thames Television's series Rooms as Eddie Graham. His well-known television roles include Sergeant Calder, a member of the British Army's bomb disposal squad, in the Doctor Who story Resurrection of the Daleks (1984), secret service detective Edwin Woodhall in the Alan Bleasdale-written drama The Monocled Mutineer (1986), Charles Dawson in soap opera Brookside, the conman Arnie in the Only Fools and Horses episode "Chain Gang" (1989), Provost Marshall in Sharpe's Gold and Dr. Malcolm Nicholson in Bad Girls, a role he played in 28 episodes. At the 2010 British Soap Awards, he was nominated as Villain of the Year for his portrayal of Dr Nicholson. He appeared in Midsomer Murders “Bantling Boy” as Geoffrey (2005). In 2006, he guest-starred in the audio drama Sapphire and Steel: Perfect Day. McGough also featured in an episode of the popular British mystery series Jonathan Creek, "The Reconstituted Corpse", in which he plays the part of Zola Zbzewski's agent, stalker and murder accomplice. In 2010, he was a regular in Doctors as Dr. Charlie Bradfield.

During the early 1970s, McGough was a member of the Half Moon Theatre Company. McGough was a member of the Royal Shakespeare Company during 1979 appearing in the productions of Antony and Cleopatra as Chief Eunuch Mardian, The Churchill Play, Once in a Lifetime, The White Guard, Wild Oats, Mens Beano and Captain Swing. McGough played Stalin in the 1985 production of Howard Barker's The Power of the Dog at Hampstead Theatre. In 2014, McGough conceived and starred in the BBC Radio 4 programme In Belloc's Footsteps.

Filmography

References

External links

Philip McGough at Theatricalia

Welsh male stage actors
British male stage actors
Welsh male television actors
British male television actors
Living people
British people of Irish descent
1950 births
People from Penygraig